NA-228 Dadu-I is a constituency for the National Assembly of Pakistan.

Members of Parliament

2018-2022: NA-234 Dadu-I

Election 2002 

General elections were held on 10 Oct 2002. Liaqat Ali Jatoi of PML-Q won by 62,388 votes.

Election 2008 

General elections were held on 18 Feb 2008. Talat Iqbal Mahesar of PPP won by 83,493 votes.

Election 2013 

General elections were held on 11 May 2013. Imran Zafar Leghari of PPP won by 110,292 votes and became the member of National Assembly.

Election 2018 

General elections were held on 25 July 2018.

See also
NA-227 Jamshoro
NA-229 Dadu-II

References

External links 
Election result's official website

NA-233